Białęgi  is a village in the administrative district of Gmina Murowana Goślina, within Poznań County, Greater Poland Voivodeship, in west-central Poland. It consists mainly of scattered cottages on both sides of the main road leading from Murowana Goślina to Oborniki. 

The village has an approximate population of 80.

References

Villages in Poznań County